Prakash Brahmbhatt is an Indian politician from Janata Dal. He was a member of 6th Lok Sabha from Baroda. He was elected to Gujarat Legislative Assembly. He was a member Janata Party's National Council in 1981-82.

References

1951 births
Living people
India MPs 1989–1991
Janata Party politicians
Janata Dal politicians
People from Vadodara
Lok Sabha members from Gujarat
Gujarat MLAs 1985–1990
Indian National Congress politicians from Gujarat